Carolin Langenhorst  (born 3 February 1996) is a German snowboarder.
 
She competed in the 2017 FIS Snowboard World Championships, and in the 2018 Winter Olympics, in parallel giant slalom.

References

External links

1996 births
Living people
German female snowboarders
Olympic snowboarders of Germany
Snowboarders at the 2018 Winter Olympics
Snowboarders at the 2022 Winter Olympics
Sportspeople from Hamm
21st-century German women